The following is a list of characters for the Heroic Age manga and anime series.

Characters

Nodos
A Nodos is a person carrying the "essence" of a Heroic Tribesman, and can thus transform into a member of the Heroic Tribe. In this form they have superhuman abilities, including enhanced strength and agility, breathing in space, sustaining weapon fire and explosions without injury, and enduring atmospheric reentry. They also seem able to freely move in zero-gravity. The Heroic Tribe life-form is stored in a stone that is sealed in the body.

Each Nodos, including Age, has a contract with a fixed set of rules, called "labors". With the exception of Age, these include protecting the Silver Tribe's Nodos, Yuty. Yuty mentions that if they do not abide by their contracts, each of their races would be destroyed. The labors of the Nodos appear to be conflicting with each other.

In extremely violent battles, such as when two or more Nodos fight, they will go completely berserk, attacking and destroying everything around them, having been consumed by their own instincts. The Silver Tribe refer to this state as being in a "Frenzy". Aware of the Heroic Tribe having destroyed hundreds of solar systems while in a Frenzy, the Silver Tribe strives to prevent multiple Nodos from fighting each other, regardless of the cost.

Age has the body of a sixteen-year-old boy, but is at least 120 years old; it is unknown how much of this time he was actually "living", as he may have been in stasis for over 100 years. Age lived on the ruined planet Oron, a world that was once verdant and peaceful, but later suffered from a cosmic cataclysm; he lived in an old, abandoned ship, and he addressed the mainframe A.I. of the ship as his mother. Age is wild by nature, but he can nevertheless be extremely good-natured. Since he was taught by the Golden Tribe, whom he considered to be his fathers, Age has limited knowledge about human society, not even knowing the meaning of "numbers", simple words, or common phrases. He has an artistic side, which is often expressed in his elaborate paintings of future events on the walls of the Argonaut.

Age's character is likely based on the mythological hero Hercules.
 
Age's Nodos form is called . It is shown to have the ability to absorb its enemies' life force and release it as a destructive energy blast.

Bellcross is considered to be the strongest of the remaining Heroic Tribe. Like the other remaining members of the Heroic Tribe, he apparently lives only for destruction and can apparently counter all the other 4 Nodos' powers with ease. While Frenzied, he releases powerful shock waves whenever he moves through space, powerful enough to destroy nearby ships. Iron Tribe computers calculated that if he continued to remain in Frenzy, he would ultimately release energy on the scale of a supernova explosion. Bellcross' main ability is originally thought to be existence, but it is later revealed that he is the key to The Golden Tribe's power.

Karkinos is a calm thinker and not easily provoked. His purple Heroic Tribe form, "Lernaea", employs some sort of corrosive gas, or similar material, as a means of attack. It is implied that this power can destroy entire solar systems. It appears as if he is capable of resurrection.
His name is based on Karkinos, a crab that tried to help a hydra defeat Heracles. Accordingly, Karkinos' Heroic Tribe form can transform into a type of hydra when on solid ground. Lernaea's main ability is thought to be Life, then revealed to be Restoration.
Karkinos' contract with the Silver Tribe contains four Labors.

A Nodos from the Planet Pore. Despite having destroyed many planets in the past, he now despises fighting, and hates to see others hurt as a result of it. His red Heroic Tribe form, "Artemia", is capable of firing massive energy beams which can engulf entire planets. Artemia also possesses the ability to turn its body into energy, which can reflect or refract energy weapons. However, it is vulnerable to gravity-based laser beams. Mehitak will not eat anything with a "life", instead drawing sustenance by consuming raw matter such as metal. Artemia's power is thought to be Light, but is then revealed to be Waves (energy fluctuation). Mehitak's contract with the Silver Tribe contains three Labors.

Lekty has the ability to teleport herself and anyone she is touching at the same time, similar to Iolaous. She is curious about why the Golden Tribe gave their tribe such an unreasonable contract, and often visits Prome to discuss their fate. She shows a measure of affection and concern for Mehitak, and is saddened whenever he must fight. Her green Hero Tribe form, "Erymanthos", allows her to manipulate time. Erymanthos is originally thought to be Time, but her true power lies in collecting the past of infinite realities, then giving them to the future to form a common destiny. Lekty's contract with the Silver Tribe contains five Labors.

Yuty La is a member of the Silver Tribe, thus having the ability to create spiritual projections of herself, and has also shown the ability of teleportation. The young female is the unspoken "leader" of the four Silver Tribe's Nodos. Yuty's philosophy can be summed up in her first response to Karkinos' question about the fifth Nodos: "People who do not submit to the Silver Tribe have no need to live." Although she seems cruel, Yuty has been shown to care for the life of Karkinos, and may have feelings for him. Yuty is under the direct control of Rome Ro, and cannot act without his express order. Yuty's black Hero Tribe form, "Kervius", can surround itself with a powerful shield capable of deflecting energy weapons, even beams strong enough to destroy a star. Kervius has the power to create massive vortexes that act like black holes, swallowing whole fleets of ships and sending them into "nothingness". This power is considered the most devastating out of the five Nodos. Kervius's power is thought to be Nothingness, but it is revealed to be the gate to the Golden Tribe's power. Yuty's contract with the Silver Tribe contains eight Labors.

Humans (Iron Tribe) 
Humanity is known to the rest of the universe as the "Iron Tribe", the name given to them by the Golden Tribe. The Iron Tribe was the last tribe to be able to travel in space, but also the only tribe to develop the necessary technology on their own. The Silver and Bronze Tribes consider the Iron Tribe to be inferior because, unlike them, the Iron Tribe was not granted this ability by the Golden Tribe. When humanity began to explore space, Earth was attacked by the Bronze Tribe (under the Silver Tribe's control). Human life on Earth was exterminated and humanity was scattered among the stars, pursued by the Bronze and Silver Tribes.

Humanity is shown united under a constitutional monarchy; while there are princes and princesses, decisions appear to be made by democratic vote. Humanity is capable of interstellar travel and has highly advanced technology (the series shows computer AIs and virtual reality screens), but it is portrayed inferior to the capabilities of the Silver and Bronze tribes.

The young princess of the Iron Tribe and the heroine of the story. By using information passed down by the royal family, she searches for the one she considers their savior. Along with her psychic and telepathic powers, she has the power to create spiritual projections, though not as powerful as those of the Silver Tribe. Her telepathic powers also seem to be so powerful that she can automatically read the minds of those around her. It also is revealed that Dhianeila cannot handle the spiritual waves of an impure man, so men have to be at least 10 meters away from her, or else she may lose consciousness and collapse. The only man to have ever been able to approach her, and make her not lose herself is Age. As the story progresses her feelings for Age eventually grow into love.

Her character is based on Deianira, a figure in Greek mythology.

The young leader of the Yunos Knights, a squadron of robot fighter pilots. Uptight but very responsible, he is extremely loyal to Dhianeila. He initially dislikes Age and gets jealous over Dhianeila becoming close to him, but quickly becomes one of his closest friends. Iolaous has a secret collection of holographic pictures of Dhianeila.

Iolaous has the ability to teleport himself and another, when he touches them. The range of this ability is most likely intra-planetary, with his longest teleport being from orbit around Titarros to the surface of said planet. Iolaous can only teleport others along with him if they are mentally willing to do so. His mecha can teleport when a special engine is engaged, and the engine is also capable of transporting other mechas along with his own, if distance between Iolaous' and the other mechas allows.

His character is based on Iolaus, a Theban who became a close friend of Heracles.

Personal attendant to Princess Dhianeila. She is also part of Argonaut's medic crew and has the ability to heal others. She appears to have a fondness for Iolaous, who has told her that she has great skills as a medic.

 and 

Twins with telekinetic abilities. A bit childlike and irresponsible, but always cheerful. They are also skilled engineers and mecha pilots; their mechas correspond with their telekinetic abilities. As Dhianeila's attendants, they were put in charge of "babysitting" Age, but are often involved in Age's childish antics. When Iolaous is depressed, they sell him pictures of Dhianeila.

Commander of the Argonaut. His mission is to protect the Princess Dhianeila and to carry out her wishes. He is also Iolaous' and the twins' father.

Mobeedo's character is likely derived from Jason, who was the leader of the Argonauts during the quest to find the Golden Fleece.

A female military officer of the Iron Tribe, and acting commander of the Azz-Azoth fleet. She and Captain Mobeedo were in officer's school together. It is said that she has the worst luck, but is highly dependable. She seems to have a rough demeanor, but is well respected by her crew. She is later transferred to Meleagros' flagship, the Althaea.

The oldest prince of the Royal family that leads humanity, and commander of the flagship Althaea and the Calydonian fleet. Dim-witted, arrogant but ambitious, he desires to lead humanity to conquer the universe. He cares nothing for others, and is envious of Dhianeila's reputation among many nobles, and only sees her as someone who comes between him and the throne. Despite that, he considers her and Age as useful tools, but ones that can easily be discarded. Moreover, he repeatedly refers to Age/Bellcross as a monster.

His name is based on a Greek hero, Meleager, who incidentally became one of the Argonauts.

The second prince of the Royal family, commander of the elite Kento Knights, and Meleagros's right hand. He supports Meleagros in his quest to conquer the universe, and shares some of his personality to boot. He also thinks of his only sister, Dhianeila, as nothing but a pest.

His name is based on Atalanta, who in Greek mythology was a female warrior that loved Meleagros.

Silver Tribe 
The Silver Tribe see themselves as the new "guardians" of space; believing that every other tribe that is inferior to them deserves to be conquered by them. Compared to other tribes, the Silver appear to be more powerful, immune to illnesses, living longer lives, and having the power to create energy from nothing. Each tribesman has been shown to possess common powers, such as long-ranged telepathy and teleportation, and creating spiritual projections. Unlike other tribes, the Silver Tribe consists of a small amount of tribesmen; their powerful spiritual powers, which helps them create superior technology, makes up for their low population. The Silver Tribe has helped many lesser species obtain low-orbit space status, but prohibited long-range space and interstellar space travel. The Silver Tribe consider individual star systems worthless, but gain wealth and power by obtaining tribute from the tribes that they have lifted up.

 
A member of the Silver Tribe, who has been tasked with destroying the Argonaut. Like Dhianeila, he has been shown to be able to create spiritual projections of himself, but in a far more powerful form that can project shields, and attack with short-range tentacle-spades. He too believes that the Iron Tribe is inferior to the Silver Tribe, and also believes that they are nothing more than barbarians. This belief is heavily enforced after he witnesses the destruction of Jupiter at the hands of the Iron Tribe. Later, after his starship is destroyed by Bellcross, Phaetho O is shown to be able to survive in hard vacuum unaided for an extended period of time. He can also create another starship in space from nothingness in minutes. because his last name O is the same as Prome's last name, it is possible that they are related, although how they are related is unknown

Commands all the Nodos except Age. He also appears to be Yuty and Phaetho O's superior. It is later revealed that Rom Ror was present when the Golden Tribe withdrew from the galaxy, and personally chased after members of the Golden Tribe, demanding that they stay and continue teaching the Silver Tribe.

She is in charge of the Silver Tribe's emotions, and can transfer emotions from her tribesmen into her, thus erasing it from them. She has also been seen sitting on a throne, talking to Lecty about the Nodos' contracts.

Bronze Tribe 
An insectoid species, the Bronze Tribe is seen by other tribes in the galaxy as the Silver Tribe's enforcement arm. Very numerous, the Bronze Tribe uses hollowed-out asteroids as starships utilizing the same Starway and Warp technology of the Silver and Iron Tribes. The Bronze Tribe's powers differ from other tribes; they seem to have limited telepathic powers, but none show the spiritual projections of the Silver and Iron Tribes.

Bronze Tribe individuals create personal force shields and project beams of energy at a target from those shields. Bronze Tribe insect bodies can survive the vacuum of space and the heat of atmospheric entry, but are still vulnerable to normal damage. At close range, acid spits from their fanged mouths. While a subset of the tribe have teleportation powers, rather than the instantaneous dematerialization/re-materialization of Iolaous and Lekty, the insects instead create gates or wormhole portals between interplanetary locations.

When the Iron Tribe combined fleet attacked Taros, the Bronze Tribe's home planet, the gates were large enough for entire asteroid ships to pass through. The Bronze Tribe has not shown a single Queen in its reproductive cycle, nor a pupa stage; the young hatch from egg sacs and mature to adult size afterward. A humanoid-shaped "controller" can be found at the heart of each asteroid ship. It is not known how the Silver Tribe convinced the Bronze Tribe to serve them so unswervingly, nor what the Bronze Tribe receives from its relationship with the Silver Tribe.

Labors
Each tribe possessing one or several Nodos is allowed to make a contract with them. They can draw a specific number of clauses (called 'Labors'), the amount of which was determined beforehand by the Golden Tribe.

Iron Tribe - The 12 Labors
The Iron Tribe was allowed to make twelve Labors, thus drawing a parallel to Heracles' Twelve Labors.

The Iron Tribe's contract goes as follows:

Treat your contractor as your King.
To serve the King and never become one.
Recover the homeland Earth to the hands of humans who are called the "Tribe of Iron".
Fight against all survivors of "Tribe of Heroic" and defeat every one of them.
Secure the Mother Planet of "Tribe of Bronze" to the hands of humans.
Secure the Mother Planet of "Tribe of Silver" to the hands of humans.
Obtain the powers of "Tribes of Gold" to foresee the future.
Obtain the knowledge of "Tribes of Gold" to generate Stars.
To make humans who are called "Tribe of Iron" to become the master of universe.
To protect the bonding party until these labors are fulfilled.
To not escape or die until these labors are fulfilled.
When these labors are fulfilled, humans also known as "Tribe of Iron" will make one contractor’s wish come true as long as such wish do not breach the 11th agreement.

Note - The above 12 labors were directly translated in episode 2 of the anime—the contract is meant for Age, the Nodos entrusted with protecting the 'Iron Tribe'.

Silver Tribe Labors
The content of some of the Silver Tribe's contracts is still unknown, but it appears to involve the protection of Yuty by the rest of the Silver Tribe's Nodos. Silver Tribe members Rom Ror and Prome O were the chief architects of the contracts.

The Silver Tribe has made contracts with a total of four Nodos:
Karkinos - contract with the Silver Tribe contains 4 Labors. While Kalkinos's contract has not been fully enumerated, it involves the protection of Yuty even at the cost of his own life.
 You must fight those who oppose the Tribe of Silver with your life.
 When the Silver Tribe attains the power of the Gold Tribe, you shall be released from servitude.
Mehitak - contract with the Silver Tribe contains 3 Labors:
 To ensure obedience to the Silver Tribe.
 As a Nodos, until all your power is spent in battle, you will obey the Silver Tribe.
 You will protect the life of the Nodos of the Silver Tribe.
Lekty - contract with the Silver Tribe contains 5 Labors:
 By submitting to the will of the Silver Tribe, your tribe shall prosper.
 You must fight against the enemies of the Silver Tribe as a Nodos.
 When the Nodos of the Silver Tribe is in danger, you must save her.
 When you have discovered the power of the Golden Tribe, you must inform the Silver Tribe.
 When the power of the Golden Tribe is being lost, you must protect it.
Yuty - contract with the Silver Tribe contains 8 Labors. While Yuty's contract has not been fully enumerated, it is chiefly concerned with obtaining the power of the Golden Tribe. She is also tasked with destroying that power should it fall out of the hands of the Silver Tribe.

References

Heroic Age